Jonny Freeman is a British actor and comedian. He is best known for his role as Frank London in the children's CBBC TV series, M.I.High. He has also starred in Dalziel & Pascoe, Doctors, EastEnders and Love Soup, as well as several television adverts for Domino's Pizza, Ford and Trebor mints.

Life and career 
Freeman trained at the East 15 Acting School. In addition to his work as an actor, Freeman appears with the London improvisational comedy group Shotgun Impro and is a resident MC at The Funny Side Comedy Clubs.

Filmography 
Dalziel and Pascoe episode "Dead Meat"
Doctors
Holby City
Love Soup
M.I. High
Silent Witness
The Wright Stuff
EastEnders

References

External links 
 

Year of birth missing (living people)
Living people
British male television actors